Nancy Chaffee Whitaker (March 6, 1929 – August 11, 2002) was an American female tennis player who was active in the 1950s.

Chaffee won the national girls' 18-and-under title in 1947. She won the U.S. Indoor National Championships, played at the Seventh Regiment Armory in Manhattan, from 1950 through 1952, defeating Althea Gibson, Beverly Baker, and Patricia Canning Todd in the finals. Chaffee reached the singles semifinals of the 1950 U.S. National Championships as an unseeded player but was beaten in three sets by first-seeded and eventual champion Margaret Osborne. She was ranked a career-high World No. 4 at the end of 1951.

Her best performance at a Grand Slam tournament was reaching the women's doubles final with Canning Todd at the 1951 U.S. National Championships, where they were defeated in straight sets by Shirley Fry and Doris Hart. At the 1951 Wightman Cup, she won her doubles match as the U.S. defeated Great Britain 6–1.

On October 13, 1951, she married baseball star Ralph Kiner with whom she had three children. She was later married to sportscaster Jack Whitaker.

Chaffee became a sports commentator for ABC, developed tennis programs at resorts, and in 1992, co-founded the Cartier tennis tournament in Long Island's East Hampton, an amateur mixed-doubles fund-raising event to benefit the American Cancer Society. She died on August 11, 2002 from complications of cancer.

Grand Slam finals

Doubles

References

1929 births
2002 deaths
American female tennis players
Tennis people from California
People from Ventura, California
Sportspeople from Ventura County, California
20th-century American women